George Bernard Flahiff, CC, CSB (October 26, 1905 – August 22, 1989) was a Canadian prelate of the Roman Catholic Church. He served as Archbishop of Winnipeg from 1961 to 1982, and was elevated to the cardinalate in 1969.

Early life and education
One of nine children, George Flahiff was born in Paris, Ontario; his father was an innkeeper. He attended St. Jerome's College in Kitchener from 1920 to 1921, and then studied at St. Michael's College in Toronto, from where he obtained a Bachelor of Arts degree in 1926. One of his professors at St. Michael's was Lester B. Pearson, the future Prime Minister who encouraged Flahiff to follow a career in diplomacy. Flahiff instead joined the Congregation of St. Basil (also known as the Basilian Fathers) in 1926, making his first profession on September 20, 1927.

Priesthood
After three years' study of theology at St. Basil's Seminary in Toronto, Flahiff was ordained to the priesthood by Archbishop Neil McNeil on August 17, 1930. He then furthered his studies in France at the University of Strasbourg (1930–1931) and at the École des Chartes (1931–1935). Upon his return to Canada, Flahiff taught history and art at the Pontifical Institute of Mediaeval Studies from 1935 to 1954. During that time, he also served as a professor of history at the University of Toronto (1940–1954) and Secretary of the Institute of Mediaeval Studies (1943–1951).

Flahiff became a member of the general council of the Basilian Fathers on July 6, 1948. He was elected local superior of the Basilians on July 1, 1951, and later superior general of the entire congregation on July 6, 1954. Reelected as superior general on June 14, 1960, he also served as President of the Canadian Religious Conference from 1959 to 1961.

Episcopal career
On March 10, 1961, Flahiff was appointed Archbishop of Winnipeg by Pope John XXIII. He received his episcopal consecration on the following May 31 from Cardinal James Charles McGuigan, with Archbishops Philip Francis Pocock and Michael Cornelius O'Neill serving as co-consecrators, at St. Michael's Cathedral.

He was created a cardinal by Pope Paul VI in 1969. In 1974, he was made a Companion of the Order of Canada.

Flahiff was one of the Council Fathers at Vatican II and played a key role in the writing of several Conciliar documents.

The Cardinal Flahiff Building, which is part of University of St. Michael's College within the University of Toronto, is named after him.

See also

References

External links
Order of Canada citation
 

1905 births
1989 deaths
Canadian cardinals
Participants in the Second Vatican Council
Companions of the Order of Canada
University of Toronto alumni
École Nationale des Chartes alumni
20th-century Roman Catholic archbishops in Canada
Roman Catholic archbishops of Winnipeg
Cardinals created by Pope Paul VI
Congregation of St. Basil